Little Black is a town located in Taylor County, Wisconsin. As of the 2000 census, the town had a total population of 1,148.

Geography
According to the United States Census Bureau, the town has a total area of 35.0 square miles (90.7 km2), of which, 35.0 square miles (90.7 km2) of it is land and 0.03% is water.

History
The western edge of the six by six mile square that would become Little Black was first surveyed in 1847 by a crew working for the U.S. government. That west edge of the town is on the Fourth Principal Meridian, the first north-south line surveyed up through the forests of Wisconsin, from which towns, sections and forties were later measured. In October 1854 a different crew of surveyors marked all the section corners in the township, walking through the woods and swamps, measuring with chain and compass. When done, the deputy surveyor filed this general description:
This Township contains some Swamps, all of which are unfit for cultivation. The North West portion is mostly worthless, being almost all Swamp. The Land is generally of poor quality, and not good farming land, the soil being poor and the rocks coming to the surface in many places. Most of the Timber is Hemlock but where there is Hardwood the land is fair(?) farming land. There is no Pine of any consequence. The Township is well watered with small streams and in the North part of the Township there is a large Stream of sufficient size for milling purposes, with high banks, rocky bottom and rapid current. There are no improvements in the Township.

When Taylor County was formed in 1875, Little Black was six miles north to south same as today, but it spanned the full width of the county, including all modern towns from Taft to Deer Creek.

Demographics
As of the census of 2000, there were 1,148 people, 403 households, and 321 families residing in the town. The population density was 32.8 people per square mile (12.7/km2).  There were 414 housing units at an average density of 11.8 per square mile (4.6/km2). The racial makeup of the town was 99.04% White, 0.35% African American, 0.09% Native American, 0.09% Asian, 0.00% Pacific Islander, 0.00% from other races, and 0.44% from two or more races. 0.52% of the population were Hispanic or Latino of any race.

There were 403 households, out of which 38.7% had children under the age of 18 living with them, 65.0% were married couples living together, 7.7% had a female householder with no husband present, and 20.3% were non-families. 14.9% of all households were made up of individuals, and 5.5% had someone living alone who was 65 years of age or older. The average household size was 2.85 and the average family size was 3.16.

In the town, the population was spread out, with 30.4% under the age of 18, 6.0% from 18 to 24, 30.2% from 25 to 44, 22.7% from 45 to 64, and 10.6% who were 65 years of age or older. The median age was 36 years. For every 100 females, there were 111.8 males. For every 100 females age 18 and over, there were 114.2 males.

The median income for a household in the town was $45,000, and the median income for a family was $48,167. Males had a median income of $31,645 versus $23,281 for females. The per capita income for the town was $17,633. 8.1% of the population and 5.2% of families were below the poverty line. 9.1% of those under the age of 18 and 8.8% of those 65 and older were living below the poverty line.

References

Towns in Taylor County, Wisconsin
Towns in Wisconsin